Elections for the Local Government Council were held in Nauru in late 1959. Seven of the nine incumbent councillors were re-elected  and Hammer DeRoburt was re-elected as Head Chief by the Council.

Results

References

Nauru
1959 in Nauru
Elections in Nauru